David Dennis Wilson (born October 5, 1960) is an American former competition swimmer and two-time Olympic medalist.  At the 1984 Summer Olympics in Los Angeles, Wilson earned a gold medal by swimming the backstroke leg for the winning U.S. team in the preliminary heats of the men's 4×100-meter medley relay.  He also won a silver medal by finishing second in the final of the men's 100-meter backstroke event.

Wilson set the national high school backstroke record his junior year at Anderson High School in Cincinnati, Ohio; set the national high school record his senior year (erasing the high school mark set earlier by Mark Spitz); and re-set his national high school backstroke record.

After competing in the 1984 Olympics, Wilson earned his MBA degree from Southern Methodist University. He worked for several real estate companies before founding Fifth Lane Real Estate Company, located in Franklin, Tennessee, in 2009. As of August 2021, Wilson is a leader in Search Nashville, an organization that connects individuals seeking answers about God.

Wilson is married to his wife Dru, and they have three children: a daughter, Dabney, and twin sons, James and Matthew.

See also
 List of Olympic medalists in swimming (men)

References

External links
 

1960 births
Living people
American male backstroke swimmers
Olympic gold medalists for the United States in swimming
Olympic silver medalists for the United States in swimming
Sportspeople from Long Beach, California
Swimmers at the 1984 Summer Olympics
Medalists at the 1984 Summer Olympics
Universiade medalists in swimming
Universiade silver medalists for the United States
Medalists at the 1981 Summer Universiade
21st-century American people
20th-century American people